HMS Narcissus was the lead ship of the Royal Navy Narcissus-class 32-gun fifth-rate frigate, launched in 1801. She participated in the War of 1812.

Career
In late 1805, Narcissus joined a squadron under the command of Commodore Sir Home Popham. This squadron was part of a force dispatched to take the Cape of Good Hope from the Dutch.

On her way to the Cape, on 30 October, Narcissus recaptured "Horatio Nelson" and the French privateer Prudent, which had captured Horatio Nelson. The action took place off Cape Mount (Liberia). In his letter, Captain Ross Donnelly of Narcissus described how he had come to capture the two vessels with the assistance of the slave ship Columbus. Donnelly had Columbus take Horatio Nelson to Cape Massarida where her late captain and part of her crew were. The privateer Prudent was armed with four 12 and eight 6-pounder guns, and had a crew of 70 men. A report in Lloyd's List (LL) stated that Narcissus had come into Saint Helena after having captured the French privateer Prudent (or Prudente ) and recaptured the Guineaman (i.e., slave ship) Horatio, of Liverpool.  Narcissus reportedly had sent Horatio on her voyage.

Later, many of the men of the Narcissus worked ashore as a part of a marine battalion. On 4 March 1806 the ship was part of a squadron lying off the Cape of Good Hope that captured the French 40-gun frigate Volontaire, added to the navy by the same name.

In April 1809, Narcissus was a part of a British squadron, off the Saintes, West Indies, which chased a French squadron, and captured the French 74-gun , of 1871 tons.  D'Hautpoul afterward served in the Royal Navy under the name HMS Abercrombie.

On 2 November 1810, Narcissus collided with the Spanish Navy fifth rate frigate . As a result of the damage she sustained in the collision, Santa Maria Magdalena subsequently was driven ashore and wrecked at the Ria de Vivero.

On 25 November 1812 Narcissus was off Navassa Island where her boats captured the schooner Joseph and Mary, Captain William Wescott, of 139 tons (bm). She had been launched in Queen Anne's County, Maryland, and had been commissioned as a privateer on 12 September 1812. Joseph and Mary was armed with four guns and had a crew of 73 men. Narcissus chased her for three hours. As Narcissuss boats approached, the men on Joseph and Mary fired on them, killing one man and wounding another. Joseph and Mary surrendered the moment the men on the boats prepared to board. There were three wounded men aboard her. Before her capture, Joseph and Mary had recaptured the American ship Piscataqua, which subsequently bilged, and a schooner that she sold in Haiti.

On 1 January 1813 Narcissus captured the brig Viper and the schooner Shepherd.  Shepherd, of 134 tons (bm), Captain Robert Hart, had a crew of 18 men and was armed with two 6-pounder and two 4-pounder guns. Narcissus captured her off Cape St Blare.

On 1 June 1813 HMS Narcissus slipped into Chesapeake Bay under the cover of darkness and attacked the USRC Surveyor. A Royal Navy boarding party of approximately 65 sailors and marines closed on Surveyor in small boats with muffled oars to conceal their approach. British forces navigated away from the cutter's six-pound deck guns and boarded the ship. A fierce effort by Surveyors crew to repel Royal Navy and Royal Marine boarders followed, described by British Lt John Crerie as one in which "her deck was disputed inch-by-inch" in a "gallant and desperate" defense. During the engagement, Royal Marine Captain Thomas Ford was mortally wounded by Captain Samuel Travis of Surveyor in a cutlass duel. Still, outnumbered more than two-to-one, Captain Travis ultimately ordered the ship's surrender. In tribute to the ferocity of Surveyors resistance, Crerie returned Travis' sword to him and he was paroled at Washington, North Carolina on 7 August 1813; the remainder of the crew were transferred to a British prison camp in Halifax, Nova Scotia.

On 13 July 1814 Narcissus captured Governor Shelby, Captain John H. Hall, was a letter of marque schooner of 184 tons (bm), built at Queen Anne's County, Maryland, in 1812 and commissioned on 11 December 1813. She was armed with three 4-pounder guns and had a crew of 11 men.

On 9 October 1814 Narcissus was contacted by HMS Dispatch, which requested support in taking the USRC Eagle, which had run aground in Long Island Sound. Upon returning to the site of Eagle, Narcissus and Dispatch found that the damaged Eagle had been re-floated. Eagle retreated and was beached and her crew moved to the shore to direct musket fire against British barges attempting to attach tow cables to the wrecked hulk. By noon on 13 October, the Royal Navy had managed to take Eagle under tow and she was captured.

Fate
Narcissus was used as a convict ship from December 1823 until she was sold for breaking up in January 1837.

Notes, citations, and references
Notes

Citations

References
 
 
 
 Ships of the Old Navy

 

Frigates of the Royal Navy
Ships built on the River Tyne
1801 ships
Maritime incidents in 1810